Nadha is the third studio album by Chilean pop rock band Kudai, released on May 13, 2008 through EMI Music in Latin America, and on August 5, 2008 through Capitol Records in United States. Produced by Koko Stambuk and Carlos Lara, the album was nominated for Best Pop Album by Group or Duet at the 9th Annual Latin Grammy Awards. Nadha, is Sanskrit for "sound from the depths of the soul". This title was chosen to demonstrate the depth and sincerity of the album's songs. Most of the songs were written by Stambuk in co-written by Kudai, which embellish lyrics about ecology, homosexuality, toxic relationships and depression. 

Nadha stands out for having a much more organic sound, compared to Kudai's previous works, detaching from synthesizers, and collaborating with renowned musicians such as Kenny Aronoff and Eric Avery. Four singles were released from the album: "Lejos De Aquí", "Nada Es Igual", "Morir de amor" and "Disfraz". A "special edition" of Nadha was reissued in December, 2008. It included  two different versions of the song "Hoy Quiero", which was released as promotional single.

Background and production
Kudai began recording their third studio album in October 2007; the members had the conviction to compose and write songs together with the producers. Together with Koko Stambuk, who wrote the track "Tú" from the re-release of their second studio album, Sobrevive, Kudai composed several songs. 

Their third studio album Nadha has 12 songs, of which six were written by the producer Koko Stambuk (ex-musician of Glup!). Three other songs are from the recognized producer Carlos Lara, who is considered to be the creator of RBD and has collaborated with musicians such as Lynda Thomas and Ricky Martin. Cathy Lean (Ex-Mal Corazón), from Chile, also wrote two of the album's songs. Nadha'''s production was described as much more organic, very different from her previous productions. "It's like a very neutral mix" between pop and rock.

Kudai band member Gabriella Villalba has said that this album is a turning point in Kudai's musical career:
"Now is the time that Kudai needs to show and prove many things because if we remain the same, we will be categorized as the teen band that will never grow. I feel that this third album is a very decisive stage for Kudai. We are going to fight to rid ourselves from the title of "the band that wants to be popular" and actually present good material."

Kudai chose to interpret the songs of Alanis Morissette and her band's bassist Eric Avery (ex-Jane's Addiction). The album was mastered at the Los Angeles, California studio Igloo Music under the direction of Gustavo Borner, who has worked with well-known artists such as Diego Torres, Ricky Martin, Sin Bandera, Phil Collins, Plácido Domingo and N'Sync, as well as working on the motion picture soundtracks of Rush Hour 2, Miami Vice and Finding Nemo.

Promotion
The album's title and other early information was announced in Kudai's official website in February, 2008. On month later, the band presented a preview of "Lejos De Aquí", the lead single from Nadha'', on Radio Disney Latin America.  The song was officially released on April 1, 2008, and its lyrics deals with global warming and its future consequences. The music video for the single, directed by Juan Pablo Olivares, entered heavy rotation across MTV Latin America, and it shows the members of Kudai with a futuristic and minimalist style. "Lejos De Aquí" received positive critical reviews, and debuted at number third on the Mexican selling singles. Kudai made their first promotional tour in the United States, visiting some cities in Texas during April 2008.

Track listing

Personnel
Information is adapted from the album's liner notes.

Kudai – lead vocals, composer
Koko Stambuk – composer, producer, arrangements, programming
Carlos Lara – composer, music director, executive producer
Gustavo Borner – producer, keyboards, engineer, mixer, mastering, arrangements, programming
Cathy Lean – composer
Jorge Flores – composer
Felipe Gajardo – composer
Tomas "Tawgs" Salter – composer
Shelly Peiken – composer
Mónica Vélez – composer
Gustavo Pinochet – composer
Dr. Alfa – composer
Daniel "Dito" Reschigna – composer
Juan Blas Caballero – composer

Mark Goldberg – guitars
Facundo Monty – guitars, background vocals
Chris Chaney – bass 
Jon Gilutin – keyboards
Ruy Folguera – keyboards, programming
Gary Novak – drums
A. Thomas – background vocals
Fernando Roldan – engineer
Joseph "Joe" Greco – engineer
Justin Moshkevich – engineer
Héctor Martínez – A&R
Angélica Pérez Allende – A&R
Ricardo Calderón – photography
Daniel Peralta (duoestudio.cl) – design

Charts

Weekly charts

Year-end charts

Sales and certifications

Release details

References

External links 
Kudai Official Site

2008 albums
Kudai albums
Pop rock albums by Chilean artists
Spanish-language albums
Concept albums
EMI Records albums
Capitol Records albums